The 2009 Diamond Anniversary Claxton Shield was the 75-year anniversary of the Claxton Shield and was held from 2 December 2008 to 8 February 2009 and was the Shield's Diamond anniversary. The Perth Heat won the tournament after defeating the New South Wales Patriots 3–2 in the third game of a best of three series.

Overview
The 2009 Shield series excluded the Australian Provincial baseball team and consisted of four, three-game series against each team including a two home, two away and a bye round for each of the teams. On top of this to start off the tournament, there was also a showcase round where each team played each other once. To celebrate the 75th anniversary, the showcase round also hosted a variety of other events such as a Home Run Derby. Teams that competed in the 2009 Claxton Shield were the New South Wales Patriots, Queensland Rams, Perth Heat, Victoria Aces and the South Australia.

The competition served as the primary selection trial for the national team to compete in the 2009 World Baseball Classic.
The first round of the WBC commenced Mexico City on 8 March 2009, a month after the final round.

Teams

Rosters

Venues

The 2009 Claxton Shield will be competed between 5 teams from around Australia in 13 different venues.

Perth Heat
Baseball Park – Perth
South Australia
Anderson Reserve – Glenelg
Blue Lake Sports Park – Mount Gambier
Victoria Aces
Melbourne Ballpark – Altona
Geelong Baseball Park – Geelong
Aerodrome Oval – Mildura
New South Wales Patriots
Blacktown Baseball Stadium – Sydney
Narrabundah Baseball Park – Canberra
Aquatic Reserve – Manly
Fred Finch Park – Wollongong
Queensland Rams
John Murray Field – Redlands
Holloway Field – Windsor
Baxter Field – Lismore

Regular season
The regular season was held from 2 December 2008 through to 18 January 2009, followed by a two-week finals series from 23 January to 8 February 2009. The season started with a showcase round featuring all five teams in a single round-robin series of matches at Blacktown Olympic Park. This was followed by five rounds of home and away games, with each team playing four 3-game series, one against each other team, two at home and two away. As there was an odd number of teams, each team also had a bye round. At the end of the home and away season, the top three teams qualified for the finals series.

Standings

Showcase - Round 1 

Round 1 notes

Round 2 

Round 2 notes

Round 3

Round 4

Round 5

8 January 2009 at 7.00pm, Baseball Park

9 January 2009 at 7.00pm, Blacktown Baseball Stadium

9 January 2009 at 7.00pm, Baseball Park

10 January 2009 at 7.00pm, Blacktown Baseball Stadium

Round 6

Championship series
The 2009 Claxton Shield finals series will have the top three teams after regular fixtures qualify. The team who finishes first will auto-qualify for the final where they will meet the winner of the 2nd vs 3rd.
Both semi-finals and finals are best of three series.

23 January 2009 at 7.00 pm, Melbourne Ballpark

24 January 2009 at 3.00 pm, Waverley

25 January 2009 at 12.00 pm, Melbourne Ballpark

6 February 2009 at 7.00 pm, Baseball Park

7 February 2009 at 7.00 pm, Baseball Park
Perth Heat def. New South Wales Patriots.

8 February 2009 at 7.30 pm, Baseball Park

Conditions
Blacktown Baseball Stadium experienced quite warm December summer weather for New South Wales. Although the average maximum temperature is 25 °C (77 °F), most games were above this, with Game 8 of the showcase round between South Australia and Victoria Aces hitting 32 °C (90 °F) during the match.

On 7 December, the temperature dropped to a maximum of 22 °C with a strong breeze over Blacktown as well as clouds, however, no rain fell and the games finished as scheduled.

A large low-pressure system and long periods of rain forced the postponement of both games on 12 December in Altona, Victoria and Canberra. Games the next day were rescheduled to allow for 7-inning double headers. Game 1 between Queensland Rams and Victoria Aces was relocated to Mildura, Victoria where Game 2 and 3 were also being played.

On 3 January, the New South Wales Patriots vs Queensland Rams second game at Baxter Field, Lismore was delayed during the 6th inning due to a small stint of heavy rain. Drizzle was present throughout the game, but was only delayed for approximately ten minutes.

Fielders Choice Player of the Series
This is awarded recognition of outstanding individual performances each round of the 2009 Claxton Shield by the Australian Baseball Federation.
Round 1 – Nick Kimpton
Round 2 – Daniel Berg
Round 3 – Tim Kennelly
Round 4 – Luke Hughes
Round 5 – Wayne Lundgren
Round 6 – Justin Huber

Statistics leaders

Awards

External links
Official Baseball Australia Website
Official 2009 Claxton Shield Page
14 December Results Courier Mail

References

 
January 2009 sports events in Australia
February 2009 sports events in Australia
December 2008 sports events in Australia
Claxton Shield